Rower–Inistioge GAA is a Gaelic Athletic Association club located in the Inistioge area of County Kilkenny, Ireland.  The club is almost exclusively concerned with hurling and camogie.

History
The Rower–Inistioge GAA club was formed in 1955 when the two existing GAA clubs in the local parish agreed to amalgamate. They were Rower and Inistioge.

The club is a senior hurling club in Kilkenny. Rower-Inistioge won the Kilkenny Intermediate Hurling Championship in 2013, beating the Emeralds in the final. They continued on to win the Leinster Intermediate and 2013–14 All-Ireland Intermediate Club Hurling Championship final.

Honours
 All-Ireland Intermediate Club Hurling Championship (1): 2014
Leinster Intermediate Hurling Championship (1): 2014
Kilkenny Senior Hurling Championships (1): 1968
Kilkenny Intermediate Hurling Championships (1): 2013
 Kilkenny Junior Hurling Championships (2): 1944 (as The Rower), 1963
 Kilkenny Under-21 Hurling Championships (1): 2016
Kilkenny Minor 'A' Hurling Championships (1): 2013
Kilkenny Intermediate Camogie Championships (1):  2012

Notable players
 Seán Cummins
 Kieran Joyce
 Pat Kavanagh
 Eddie Keher
 Sean Cummins
 Kieran Joyce
 Richie Leahy
 Joe Lyng
 Pat Lyng
 Tom Malone
 Tommy Murphy
 Willie Murphy

References

Gaelic games clubs in County Kilkenny
Hurling clubs in County Kilkenny